Problem Child is an animated television series co-produced by Universal Cartoon Studios, D'Ocon Films Productions for season 1 and Lacewood Productions for season 2, and based on the Problem Child films. The series was first premiered on USA Network (part of USA Cartoon Express block) in October 31, 1993 until the final episode's airing in December 4, 1994. A significant feature has Gilbert Gottfried reprising his role of Igor Peabody from the films; this makes him the only actor in every film in the series and the cartoon.

Synopsis
10-year-old Junior continues his not-so-evil adventures with his father Little Ben Healy (who is now a police officer) and his new friend, Cyndi in Toe Valley. Junior continues to make life miserable for those who get in his way like his principal Igor Peabody and Junior's grandfather Big Ben Healy with pranks and mischievous ideas.

Characters
 Junior Healy (voiced by Ben Diskin) – the main protagonist and a mischievous young boy who causes retributive trouble against the uncaring adults that get in his way.
 Ben Healy (voiced by Mark Taylor) – Junior's kindhearted adoptive father and the sheriff of Toe Valley.
 Big Ben Healy (voiced by Jonathan Harris) – one of the main antagonists; Ben's father and Junior's grandfather, Big Ben is the mayor of Toe Valley.
 Igor Peabody (voiced by Gilbert Gottfried) – one of the main antagonists; Mr. Peabody is the principal of the local elementary school, and one of Junior's main rivals.
 Murph (voiced by John Kassir) – one of Junior's classmates, a former bully turned accomplice.
 Cyndi Kerrigan (voiced by E. G. Daily) – one of Junior's classmates, Cyndi is a pretty, popular girl whose name is a reference to figure skater Nancy Kerrigan.

Television airing and home media
USA Network aired the series as part of their USA Cartoon Express programming block. In the mid-to-late 2000s, Spanish-speaking TeleFutura (now UniMas) aired reruns of the series.

Five tapes (containing two episodes each) were released in 1995 containing episodes from seasons 1 and 2. Currently, the series is now streaming on Tubi.

Episodes

Season 1: 1993–94

Season 2: 1994

Credits

Cast

 Ben Diskin as Junior Healy
 Gilbert Gottfried as Igor Peabody
 Nancy Cartwright as Betsy, Ross
 E.G. Daily as Cyndi Kerrigan
 Jonathan Harris as Big Ben Healy
 John Kassir as Murph, Yoji
 Cree Summer as Spencer, Additional voices (Season 1)
 Mark Taylor as Ben Healy

Additional voices

 Charles Adler (Season 1)
 John Astin
 Michael Bell (Season 1)
 Gregg Berger (Season 1)
 Sheryl Bernstein (Season 2)
 Earl Boen (Season 2)
 Becky Bonar (Season 2)
 S. Scott Bullock
 Rodger Bumpass (Season 1)
 Corey Burton (Season 1)
 Joey Camen (Season 2)
 Victoria Carroll (Season 1)
 Dan Castellaneta (Season 1)
 Marsha Clark (Season 1)
 Brian Cummings (Season 2)
 Jim Cummings
 Debi Derryberry
 Denny Dillon (Season 1)
 Dave Fennoy (Season 2)
 Pat Fraley
 Brad Garrett (Season 2)
 Linda Gary (Season 1)
 Benny Grant (Season 2)
 Jess Harnell (Season 2)
 Billie Hayes (Season 2)
 Dana Hill
 Michael Horse (Season 2)
 Tino Insana (Season 2)
 Maurice LaMarche
 Katie Leigh (Season 1)
 Sherry Lynn (Season 2)
 Danny Mann
 Edie McClurg
 Candi Milo (Season 2)
 Iona Morris
 Laraine Newman
 Valery Pappas (Season 2)
 Hal Rayle (Season 1)
 Bob Ridgely (Season 1)
 Pamela Segall
 B.J. Ward (Season 1)
 April Winchell -

Crew
 Ginny McSwain - Voice Director

References

External links
 

 

1993 American television series debuts
1994 American television series endings
1993 Canadian television series debuts
1994 Canadian television series endings
1993 Spanish television series debuts
1994 Spanish television series endings
1990s American animated television series
1990s Canadian animated television series
1990s Spanish television series
Television series by Universal Animation Studios
USA Network original programming
English-language television shows
Animated television shows based on films
American children's animated comedy television series
Canadian children's animated comedy television series
Spanish children's animated comedy television series
Animated television series about children